Virgil Roberts (April 13, 1922 – April 6, 2011) was an American politician, train dispatcher, and farmer who served as a member of the Wisconsin State Assembly.

Early life 
Born in Mindoro, Wisconsin, Roberts was rejected for military service during World War II because of a heart defect.

Career 
Roberts became interested in public service after taking a course at Winona State University. He later served on the local school board. Roberts worked as a train dispatcher and farmer. Later, Roberts served as a bank director.

From 1971 to 1985 and 1987 to 1993, Roberts served as a member of the Wisconsin State Assembly. He was an unsuccessful nominee for the Wisconsin State Senate in the 1984 election. Roberts was a Democrat.

Death 
He died on April 6, 2011 in La Crosse, Wisconsin, one week before his 89th birthday.

Notes

1922 births
2011 deaths
Dispatchers
Democratic Party members of the Wisconsin State Assembly
People from Farmington, La Crosse County, Wisconsin
School board members in Wisconsin
Winona State University alumni